The Fifth Column is a Lebanese-American short film, directed by Vatche Boulghourjian. The film depicts an atmosphere of desperation in the Armenian quarter Bourj Hammoud, a suburb of Beirut. The film is entirely in Western Armenian dialect.

It competed in the 2010 Cannes Film Festival where it was awarded 3rd Prize by the Cinéfondation, La Sélection. In August 2010 it was presented at the opening night of the Lebanese Film Festival in Beirut where it won 1st Prize, Best Film. The Fifth Column was screened at the Abu Dhabi Film Festival in October 2010, where it won Best Student Short Film, 1st Prize.

It was also presented at the San Sebastian International Film Festival, the Doha Tribeca Film Festival, Beirut Cinema Days, and the Golden Apricot International Film Festival. In January 2011 the film was presented at Emir Kusturica's Kustendorf Film & Music Festival, and was awarded the Film Critics' Press Award.

Cast
Harry Simitian – Hrag
Vartan Megeurdichian – Mher, Father
Boghos Sbadjian – The Projectionist
Manuel Markarian – Mr. Jano, the Cobbler
Zohrab Nalbandian – The Principle
Melkon Boudakian – Boy 1
David Daoud – Boy 2
Hovsep Kaplanian – Suren, the Grocer
Linda Megeurdichian – Arpi, the Pharmacist
Sako Ohanian – The Internet Café Manager
Marie-Rose Manougian – Araxi, Grandmother
Aida Srabonian – The Nurse
Kevork Nalbandian – The Policeman
Berge Fazlian – The Priest

See also
Cinema of Lebanon

References

External links
 

2010 films
Student films
2010 short films
Lebanese short films